Valley Springs is a town in Boone County, Arkansas, United States. The population was 175 at the 2010 census. It is part of the Harrison Micropolitan Statistical Area.

Geography
Valley Springs is located at  (36.154820, -92.991497).

According to the United States Census Bureau, the town has a total area of 1.2 km (0.5 mi2), all land.

List of highways 

 U.S. Highway 65
 Arkansas Highway 206

Demographics

As of the census of 2010, there were 175 people, 69 households, and 54 families residing in the town. The population density was 137.2/km (352.0/mi2). There were 73 housing units at an average density of 60.0/km (153.9/mi2). The racial makeup of the town was 95.21% White, 1.20% Native American, 1.20% Asian, 0.60% Pacific Islander, 0.60% from other races, and 1.20% from two or more races. 0.60% of the population were Hispanic or Latino of any race.

There were 66 households, out of which 34.8% had children under the age of 18 living with them, 63.6% were married couples living together, 13.6% had a female householder with no husband present, and 21.2% were non-families. 16.7% of all households were made up of individuals, and 6.1% had someone living alone who was 65 years of age or older. The average household size was 2.53 and the average family size was 2.85.

In the town, the population was spread out, with 28.7% under the age of 18, 5.4% from 18 to 24, 29.3% from 25 to 44, 25.7% from 45 to 64, and 10.8% who were 65 years of age or older. The median age was 36 years. For every 100 females, there were 85.6 males. For every 100 females age 18 and over, there were 83.1 males.

The median income for a household in the town was $27,143, and the median income for a family was $27,321. Males had a median income of $16,136 versus $17,708 for females. The per capita income for the town was $11,614. About 17.6% of families and 18.0% of the population were below the poverty line, including 24.4% of those under the age of eighteen and 10.5% of those 65 or over.

Education 
Valley Springs, along with Bellefonte and Everton, is within the Valley Springs School District, which leads to graduation at Valley Springs High School.

References

External links
 Map of Valley Springs (US Census Bureau)
 Boone County Historical and Railroad Society, Inc.
 Valley Springs School District
 Town government information
 Detailed 2000 US Census statistics
 Boone County School District Reference Map (US Census Bureau, 2010)

Towns in Boone County, Arkansas
Towns in Arkansas
Harrison, Arkansas micropolitan area